Öljeytü Khan (Mongolian: Өлзийт;), born Temür (October 15, 1265 – February 10, 1307), also known by his imperial Chinese temple name Emperor Chengzong of Yuan, was the second emperor of the Yuan dynasty of China, ruling from May 10, 1294 to February 10, 1307. Apart from Emperor of China, he is considered as the sixth Great Khan of the Mongol Empire, although it was only nominal due to the division of the empire. He was an able ruler of the Yuan dynasty, and his reign established the patterns of power for the next few decades. 

Temür was a son of the Crown Prince Zhenjin and a grandson of the Yuan founder Kublai Khan. During his rule, he achieved the nominal suzerainty of all Mongol states of the time. He showed respect for Confucianism, and called off invasions of Burma (Pagan), Đại Việt and Kamakura Japan. However, his reign was beset by corruption and administrative inefficiencies.

Early life 

Named as the "blessed iron Khan" in the Mongolian language, Temür was born the third son of Zhenjin of the Borjigin and Kökejin (Bairam-Egechi) of the Khunggirad on October 15, 1265. Because Kublai's first son Dorji died early, his second son and Temür's father, Zhenjin, became the crown prince. However, he died in 1286 when Temür was 21 years old. Kublai remained close to Zhenjin's widow Kökejin, who was high in his favor. Like his grandfather Kublai, Temür was a follower of Buddhism.

Temür followed his grandfather Kublai to suppress the rebellion of Nayan (Naiyan) and other rival relatives in 1287. Then he and Kublai's official, Oz-Temür, came to guard the Liao River area and Liaodong in the east from Nayan's ally, Qadaan, and defeated him. Kublai appointed Temür the princely overseer of Karakorum and surrounding areas in July 1293. Three Chagatai princes submitted to him while he was defending Mongolia (they fled to Chagatai Khanate soon and returned to Yuan dynasty again during the reign of Temür).

After Kublai Khan died in 1294, Kublai's old officials urged the court to summon a kurultai in Shangdu. Because Zhenjin's second son Darmabala had already died in 1292, only his two sons, Gammala and Temür, were left to succeed. It was proposed that they hold a competition over who had better knowledge of Genghis Khan's sayings. Temür won and was declared the emperor.

Reign 

Following in the policies of his grandfather Kublai, Temür was finally able to achieve nominal suzerainty of the entire Mongol realm. However, he failed to improve the corruption and administrative inefficiencies that was endemic during his rule of the empire. 

Ideologically, Temür's administration showed respect for Confucianism and Confucian scholars. Shortly after his accession, Temür issued an edict to revere Confucius. Temür appointed Harghasun, who was particularly close to the Confucian scholars, right grand chancellor in the secretariat. Nevertheless, the Mongol court did not accept every principle of Confucianism. Temür bestowed new guards and assets on his mother and renamed her ordo (great palace-tent or camp) Longfugong palace, which became a center of Khunggirad power for the next few decades. Mongol and westerner statesmen were assisted by an array of Chinese administrators and Muslim financiers. The most prominent Muslim statesman was Bayan (Баян), great-grandson of Saiyid Ajall Shams al-Din, who was in charge of the Ministry of Finance. Under Mongol administrators Oljei and Harghasun, the Yuan court adopted policies that were designed to ensure political and social stability. Orders were given that portraits be painted of the khagans and khatuns during the reign of Temür. 

The number of the Tibetans in the administration gradually increased. The Khon family of Tibet was honored, and one of them became an imperial son-in law in 1296. Temür reversed his grandfather's anti-Taoist policy and made Taoist Zhang Liusun co-chair of the Academy of Scholarly Worthies. In 1304, Temür appointed the Celestial master of Dragon and Tiger Mountain as head of the Orthodox Unity School. He banned sales and distillation of alcohol in Mongolia in 1297, and the French historian René Grousset applauded his activity in the book, The Empire of the Steppes. 

Temür was opposed to imposing any additional fiscal burden on the people. Exemptions from levies and taxes were granted several times for part or all of the Yuan. After his enthronement, Temür exempted Khanbaliq (Dadu, modern Beijing) and Shangdu from taxes for a year. He also exempted the Mongol commoners from taxation for two years. In 1302 he prohibited the collection of anything beyond the established tax quotas. The financial state of the government deteriorated, however, and the draining of monetary reserves greatly weakened the credibility of the paper currency system. Corruption among officials of the Yuan became a problem.

During the last years of Temür, a peace among the Yuan dynasty and the western Mongol khanates (Golden Horde, Chagatai Khanate, Ilkhanate) was achieved around 1304 after the Kaidu–Kublai war that had lasted for more than 30 years and caused the permanent division of the Mongol Empire. Temür Khan was recognized as their nominal suzerain. While the peace itself was short-lived and the war soon resumed, this established the nominal supremacy of the Yuan dynasty over the western khanates that lasted for a few decades.

Foreign Policy: Southeast Asia 

Soon after his enthronement in 1294, Temür called off all preparations for further expansions to Japan and the Đại Việt, whose new ruler ignored his grandfather's envoy in 1291. Temür sent his messengers to Japan and Champa to demand submissions. Champa accepted the terms, but the Kamakura shogunate declined, and the Japanese Wokou attacked Ningbo late in his reign. The rulers of Đại Việt, Burma, and Sukhotai visited Khanbaliq to greet him as their overlord in 1295, 1297, and 1300. In response to the visit from the prince of Burma, he aborted the Burmese campaign and said to all his ministers: "They are our friendly subjects. Do not attack their people". Temür also released envoys of Đại Việt to show his goodwill, and the Tran court began to send tributary missions. But Temür's government had to quell rebellions in the southwestern mountainous area, led by tribal chieftains like Song Longji and female leader Shejie in 1296. It took long months for the generals Liu Shen and Liu Guojie to suppress these rebellions.

By the request of the Burmese prince, Tribhuvanaditya, Temür dispatched a detachment of the Yuan army to Burma in 1297. They successfully repelled the Shans from Myanmar. Temür also received envoys from Siam and Cambodia. He dispatched Zhou Daguan to Khmer Cambodia in 1296, and Zhou wrote an account about his journey. In 1299 Athinkaya murdered his brother Tribhuvanaditya, who submitted to Temür in 1297. In 1300, a punitive expedition was launched as the Second Mongol invasion of Burma for dethroning Temür's protectorate, Tribhuvanaditya. The Shan warlords of Babai-Xifu, who were quarreling over the royal succession of Pagan, also raided the Yuan realms. Temür sent his Yunnan-based force in turn to halt the advance of Babaixifu (Lanna Kingdom of Chiangmai) in 1301–1303. Although those campaigns were fruitless, Athinkaya and the Shan lords offered their submission. The costly expedition spurred rebellions of a Yunnan official, Song Longji, and the Gold-Tooths (ancestors of the Dai people) in 1301–03. The revolts were eventually suppressed. After Temür Khan ordered to withdraw his army from Burma, Central and southern Burma soon came under the Thai rulers who paid nominal tribute to the Yuan dynasty.

Death 

Because his only son Teshou died a year earlier (January 1306), Temür died without a male heir, in the capital Khanbaliq on February 10, 1307 as Öljeytü Khan.Though he did not use a Chinese regnal name as Emperor during his two eras of Yuánzhēn (元貞) 1295–1297 then Dàdé (大德), 1297–1307, while Kublai had done so before him, posthumously he became Emperor Qinming Guangxiao (欽明廣孝皇帝) with temple name Emperor Chengzong of Yuan. He was succeeded by Khayishan, a son of his deceased elder brother Darmabala, who ruled as Külüg Khan and Emperor Tongtian Jisheng Qinwen Yingwu Dazhang Xiao (統天繼聖欽文英武大章孝皇帝) with later temple name Emperor Wuzong of Yuan and who made a pact before his coronation for his younger brother Ayurbarwada to be crown prince before any progeny of Khayishan, and then for their descendants to alternate rule; though this pact was broken and Khayishan's descendants persecuted by Ayurbarwada's mother after Ayurbarwada succeeded as Buyantu Khan with later temple name Emperor Renzong of Yuan. A bit downstream, the Khan and Emperor title would pass out of both Temür and Darmabala's descendants to one from their brother Gammala who had been older than Temür but lost  out as successor in the competition devised to choose between them.

Family 
Empress Shiriandali, (失怜答里皇后) of the Hongjila clan (弘吉剌氏) from Onggirat, daughter of Oločin Küregen
Prince Deshou (德寿; 13th century—3 January 1306), first son
Empress Bulugan,  (卜鲁罕皇后) of the Baya'ut clan (巴牙惕氏)
Empress Huteni, of the Huteni clan (乞里吉忽帖尼)
Köden (闊端; 1206 – 1247/1251), second son
Mieli (灭里), seventh son
Unknown:
Princess Chang, personal name Yilihaiya (昌国公主; 益里海雅), first daughter
Princess Zhao, personal name Aiyashili (赵国公主; 爱牙失里), second daughter
Princess Lu, personal name Puna (鲁国公主普纳), third daughter

Ancestry

See also
 List of emperors of the Yuan dynasty
 List of Mongol rulers
 List of rulers of China
 Yuan dynasty in Inner Asia

References

Citations

Sources 

 
 Цэен-ойдов Чингис Богдоос Лигдэн Хутаг хүртэл 36 хаад
 

Great Khans of the Mongol Empire
Chengzong
Yuan dynasty Buddhists
Chinese Buddhist monarchs
13th-century Chinese monarchs
13th-century Mongol rulers
14th-century Chinese monarchs
14th-century Mongol rulers
1265 births
1307 deaths
Mongolian Buddhist monarchs